Stiegler a surname, may refer to:

Anna Stiegler, German politician
Bernard Stiegler, French philosopher
, French political philosopher
Johnnie Stiegler, American pair skater
Josef "Pepi" Stiegler, Austrian alpine skier
Judy Stiegler. American politician
Ludwig Stiegler, German politician
Marc Stiegler, American science fiction author and software developer
Resi Stiegler, American alpine skier
Robert Stiegler, Chicago filmmaker and photographer
Stephanie Stiegler, American pair skater 
Tiffany Stiegler, American figure skater